Double Patty is a 2021 South Korean drama film.

Double Patty may also refer to:

Double cheeseburger, a cheeseburger with two patties

Film and television
Double Patty (2015 short film), a 2015 Australian short film

See also
Double Patti, a type of turban